The Division of Mitchell is an Australian electoral division in the state of New South Wales.

Mitchell is a largely white collar, upper class and socially conservative electorate in the Hills district of northwestern Sydney. Mitchell includes the suburbs of Baulkham Hills, Bella Vista, Castle Hill, Northmead, North Rocks, West Pennant Hills and Winston Hills, along with the quickly growing housing estates around Kellyville and Rouse Hill.

Mitchell has recently experienced a demographic shift, with wealthier households choosing to reside in the Hills District. As a subsequent result, the 2021 Census showed that households within the electorate have overtaken the neighbouring Division of Bradfield as the highest level of median weekly household income of any electorate in Australia. This has also been reflected in voting trends and broader political views, as Mitchell is the most conservative metropolitan electorate and the second most conservative electorate in Australia after the Division of Maranoa.

History

The division is named after Major Thomas Mitchell, surveyor and explorer who was the first European to explore large areas of New South Wales and Victoria. The division was proclaimed at the redistribution of 11 May 1949, and was first contested at the 1949 federal election. The majority of the electorate is fairly conservative, and it has been a safe seat for the Liberal Party of Australia for most of its existence. Labor has won it twice, for one term each.  Labor last won it in 1972 in the swing that brought Gough Whitlam to power. However, proving this seat's conservative nature, the Liberals took it back in 1974 and have held it without serious difficulty since then. A 1984 redistribution cut out Richmond and the Hawkesbury River area, making this already safely conservative seat even more so. The current Member for Mitchell, since the 2007 federal election, is Liberal Alex Hawke.

The seat includes most of the Hills District, a region with a large evangelical Christian population that has pushed the seat further to the right.  However, the southernmost suburbs of North Rocks, Northmead and Winston Hills are located in the Parramatta local government area, and share that LGA's bellwether tendencies.  They been won by Labor at high-tide elections such as at the 2007 federal election.  After the 2013 federal election, Mitchell replaced nearby Bradfield as the safest Coalition seat in metropolitan Australia, with Labor needing a 22-point swing to win it. As of the 2019 federal election, it is the second-safest metropolitan Coalition seat, behind Cook, with an 18.6-point swing needed for Labor to win it.

Boundaries
Since 1984, federal electoral division boundaries in Australia have been determined at redistributions by a redistribution committee appointed by the Australian Electoral Commission. Redistributions occur for the boundaries of divisions in a particular state, and they occur every seven years, or sooner if a state's representation entitlement changes or when divisions of a state are malapportioned.

The division is located in the Hills District of Sydney, and includes the entire suburbs of Baulkham Hills, Beaumont Hills, Bella Vista, Norwest, Box Hill, Kellyville, North Kellyville, Nelson, and Winston Hills. The division also includes parts of Castle Hill, Glenhaven, Maraylya, North Rocks, Northmead, Old Toongabbie, Rouse Hill, and West Pennant Hills.

Members

Election results

References

External links
 Division of Mitchell - Australian Electoral Commission

Electoral divisions of Australia
Constituencies established in 1949
1949 establishments in Australia